Janiszew may refer to the following places:
Janiszew, Greater Poland Voivodeship (west-central Poland)
Janiszew, Łódź Voivodeship (central Poland)
Janiszew, Masovian Voivodeship (east-central Poland)